The eleventh season of American Idol premiered on Fox on January 18, 2012. The show aired on Wednesdays and Thursdays at 8/7c. Ryan Seacrest returned as host, while Randy Jackson, Steven Tyler, and Jennifer Lopez all returned as judges. Interscope Records Chairman Jimmy Iovine, a songwriter and producer, also returned as an in-house mentor to work with the contestants on a weekly basis. This season followed the same format as season 10. Tyler and Lopez announced that they would be leaving the show two months after the finale. Lopez later returned as a judge for the show's thirteenth season.

The season set a record when 132 million votes were gathered for the finale. On May 23, 2012, Phillip Phillips became the winner of the eleventh season of American Idol, beating Jessica Sanchez, the first female recipient of the judges' save.

Regional auditions
Auditions took place in the following cities:

The New Jersey audition episode was not aired due to scheduling changes.
The New Jersey audition was a late addition to the schedule, the audition was held although the attendance was reportedly low. However, the audition episode was not shown, the first time that a scheduled audition that had taken place was not shown. Contestants known to have auditioned in New Jersey were listed as having auditioned elsewhere on the official American Idol website, for example Alex Wong who auditioned in New Jersey has San Diego listed as his audition city on the official website.

Hollywood week and Vegas rounds
The Hollywood rounds of auditions were held at the Pasadena Civic Auditorium starting December 12, 2011. There were 309 contestants at the start of Hollywood Week. The contestants performed solo for the first round, and 185 made the cut. Amongst those sent home included actor/comedian Jim Carrey's daughter, Jane Carrey. The second round involved group performances, and a number of contestants became ill and collapsed in the auditorium. 98 contestants moved on to the third and final round, which were solo performances accompanied by a band or instrument. The contestants were then separated into four rooms, where one room of 28 contestants were all eliminated, while the 70 contestants in the other three rooms all advanced to the Las Vegas round.

After Hollywood, the contestants went to Las Vegas for a challenge round where they performed traditional late 1950s song in groups with Elvis Presley "Viva, Elvis!" show as the backdrop. 28 of the 70 contestants were eliminated. Next came a solo round accompanied by an instrument at the stage for Le Rêve at the Wynn Las Vegas.
After the 42 remaining contestants sang their last solo at the Wynn Las Vegas hotel, they were called one by one to hear the final judgement. Twelve guys and twelve girls were initially announced as the semi-finalists; however, the judges announced plans to add a thirteenth male semi-finalist between Jermaine Jones, Richie Law, Johnny Keyser and David Leathers Jr. The following week, after the male performances, Jermaine Jones was revealed to be the thirteenth performer.

Semi-finalists

The following is a list of semi-finalists who failed to reach the finals:

Semi-finals
The semi-finals round started on February 28. Below are the two semi-final groups (males and females) with contestants listed in their performance order. The top five males and top five females, along with the three wild card choices by the judges, advanced to the finals. The males started the semifinal round, and the females continued on following night's episode, the contestants perform songs of their choice. This season, long-time vocal coach Debra Byrd was replaced by Jimmy Iovine's own team in the live shows.

Color key:

Wild Card round
Following those ten singers advancing on Thursday, March 1, six of the remaining 25 semi-finalists were selected by the judges to compete in the Wild Card round. The Wild Card round immediately began, following the announcement of the ten finalists. Following another performance by each Wild Card contender, the judges then selected three contestants to advance to the final group of 13.

Finalists 

 Phillip Phillips (born September 20, 1990) is from Leesburg, Georgia. He attended Lee County High School. He graduated Albany Technical College, but had to miss the graduation ceremony due to being on American Idol. He auditioned in North Charleston, singing "Superstition" by Stevie Wonder and Michael Jackson's "Thriller" with the guitar. He performed "I Only Have Eyes For You" with Heejun Han, Neco Starr, and Jairon Jackson during Hollywood Week. Many people have compared his vocal style to that of Dave Matthews, whom he has also noted as an influence. Phillips was announced the winner on May 23. Philips' coronation song, "Home", was a success with sales of 5.4 million copies in the United States.

 Jessica Sanchez (born August 4, 1995) is from San Diego, California. Sanchez auditioned in San Diego. She performed "It Doesn't Matter Anymore" with DeAndre Brackensick and Candice Glover in Las Vegas. During the Sing For Your Life green mile round, Sanchez performed "The Prayer" by Andrea Bocelli. Before Idol, she was known for her appearance on the first season of America's Got Talent where she was brought back by judge Brandy during the show's wildcard round. Sanchez also participated in the YouTube edition of "We Are the World" along with 56 other YouTube artists, including American Idol season 10 finalist Thia Megia. She was saved from elimination by the judges after receiving the lowest number of votes in the top seven round, making her the first female contestant to be saved by the judges and eventually the first Asian American contestant on American Idol to advance to the finale. Sanchez was announced the runner-up on May 23, 2012.

 Joshua Ledet (born April 9, 1992) is from Westlake, Louisiana. He writes songs and lyrics for and attends the House of Prayer Holiness Church. He auditioned in Houston, Texas. He originally auditioned for American Idol season 10, but he did not make it past the audition stage. He was dubbed "Mantasia" (as being the male version of American Idol season three winner Fantasia Barrino) during the semi-finals. He performed "Blue Suede Shoes" with Shannon Magrane, Amber Holcomb, and Curtis Finch Jr. His musical influences are his mother, Christina Aguilera, Whitney Houston, Michael Jackson, Fantasia Barrino, James Brown, Luther Vandross, Stevie Wonder and Elton John. He was eliminated on May 17, coming in third place.

 Hollie Cavanagh (born July 5, 1993) is originally from  Liverpool, Merseyside, England but grew up in McKinney, Texas. She originally auditioned for season 10, but she was eliminated in the green mile round and was encouraged by Jennifer Lopez that she could win the competition in a couple of years with practice. Hollie sang "Mr. Sandman" with Naomi Gillies and Marissa Pontecorvo in Las Vegas. Hollie's only appearance in season 11 was during the Top 42 green mile round. She sang "Change" by American Idol season four winner Carrie Underwood for the Sing for Your Life round. She was eliminated on May 10, coming in fourth place. She auditioned in Galveston.

 Skylar Laine (born February 1, 1994) is from Brandon, Mississippi. She is the second finalist to hail from Mississippi, with the previous one being Jasmine Murray from season eight. She auditioned in Galveston, singing "Hell on Heels" by Pistol Annies. In Las Vegas, she performed "Dedicated to the One I Love" with Colton Dixon, Chase Likens, and Cari Quoyeser. Her musical influences include George Jones, Waylon Jennings, and Miranda Lambert. She was eliminated on May 3, coming in fifth place.

 Elise Testone (born July 29, 1983) is from Mount Pleasant, South Carolina. She auditioned in North Charleston with the song "Get It While You Can" by Janis Joplin. Prior to Idol, she was a voice instructor in Mount Pleasant, South Carolina, and she performed regularly, either solo or with one of several bands, in Charleston, South Carolina. In 2011, her band, the Freeloaders, won the Funk/Soul/R&B Artist of the Year award in the Charleston City Paper’s Music issue. Testone received additional recognition from the Charleston City Paper in 2011, winning the staff pick for Best Tribute for Elise Testone’s James Brown Dance Party. She has performed as an opening act for various other artists, including Snoop Dogg, Nappy Roots, Seven Mary Three, and Kevin Costner’s band, Modern West. She was eliminated on April 26, coming in sixth place. Her debut album, In This Life was released on February 11, 2014.

 Colton Dixon (born October 19, 1991) is from Murfreesboro, Tennessee. He auditioned in North Charleston with his younger sister, Schyler. He originally auditioned for season 10 along with Schyler in the Nashville, Tennessee, auditions, but she was cut in the group round and then he was cut in the green mile round. Dixon returned in season 11, however he did not plan to audition, initially planning to simply accompany his sister Schyler to her audition. The judges implored Dixon to audition as well, where he sang David Cook's "Permanent". Colton performed "Dedicated to the One I Love" with Skylar Laine, Chase Likens, and Cari Qouyeser in Las Vegas. In Las Vegas, Schyler was eliminated, bringing Colton to tears. He performed the Coldplay song "Fix You", and dedicated it to his sister. He was eliminated on April 19, coming in seventh place. Prior to his elimination, Dixon had never been in the Bottom 3. His debut album A Messenger was released on January 29, 2013.

 DeAndre Brackensick (born October 21, 1994) is from San Jose, California. He auditioned in San Diego, California. He originally auditioned for American Idol season 10, but he was cut in the green mile round. He performed "It Doesn't Matter Anymore" with Jessica Sanchez and Candice Glover in Las Vegas. He was an active participant in Oak Grove High School's Theater Arts program and the president of the school's Polynesian Club when he attended. He was eliminated on April 5, coming in eighth place.

 Heejun Han (born April 20, 1989) is from Flushing, New York. He and his family migrated to Queens from Anyang, Gyeonggi, South Korea, when he was a child. Before American Idol, he was a non-profit organizer, working with children with special needs. He has spoken of suffering from emotional depression and credited the children that he worked with for helping him to recover from his illness. He has also said that the children motivated him to audition for American Idol. He auditioned in Pittsburgh with "How Am I Supposed to Live Without You". His audition brought Jennifer Lopez to tears, and Steven Tyler stated "I think you are really great. I think you could be the American Idol". He is the first Korean American to make the finals on American Idol. He was eliminated on March 29, coming in ninth place.

 Erika Van Pelt (born December 12, 1985) is from South Kingstown, Rhode Island. She auditioned in Pittsburgh, Pennsylvania, with song "Will You Love Me Tomorrow" by The Shirelles. She draws her influences anywhere from Aretha Franklin, Chaka Khan, Joss Stone, Jill Scott, and Kim Burrell. She has a passion for rhythm and blues, soul, country, jazz, rock and classical. She was eliminated on March 22, coming in tenth place. Her debut album, My Independence was released on October 8, 2013.

 Shannon Magrane (born October 21, 1995) is from Tampa, Florida. She is the daughter of Tampa Bay Rays broadcaster and former St. Louis Cardinals pitcher Joe Magrane. She auditioned in North Charleston, South Carolina, with the song "Something's Got a Hold on Me" by Etta James. She was eliminated on March 15, coming in eleventh place.

 Jermaine Jones (born November 18, 1986) is from Pine Hill, New Jersey. He auditioned in Portland, Oregon. He attended Overbrook High School. Before Idol, he worked as a vocal instructor at Highest Praise Performing Arts Center. Jones was not originally chosen for the semi-finals, but he was called back after the top 24 selection filming, making him the 25th semi-finalist and thirteenth male semi-finalist. Standing 6 feet 8 and a half inches tall, he was dubbed "The Gentle Giant" on the show. His musical influences are his mother and John Legend. On March 13, he was disqualified for concealing arrests and outstanding warrants. He is the second Idol contestant to be disqualified during the finals, as Corey Clark was disqualified in the second season, and he came in twelfth place.

 Jeremy Rosado (born March 24, 1992) is from Valrico, Florida. Rosado previously auditioned for American Idol four times. He was eliminated on March 8, coming in thirteenth place. He is the fourth wild card finalist to be the eliminated first in the finals, with his female predecessors being Leah LaBelle (season three), Jasmine Murray (season eight), and Ashthon Jones (season ten). His musical influences are Francesca Battistelli, Kirk Franklin, and Israel Houghton. His debut single, Don't be Afraid was released on April 2, 2013.

Finals
In this season, maintaining the previous season's format, there were 12 weeks of the finals and 13 finalists, with one finalist eliminated per week based on the American public's votes, with the exception of two weeks ('Top 13' had the judges eliminate one contestant from the two who received a lower vote for each gender, and 'Top 12' had Jones' facing disqualification). Previous season's winner Scotty McCreery recorded the Tim McGraw song cover "Please Remember Me" as the song played during the eliminated contestant's montage. Jimmy Iovine reprised his role as a weekly mentor to contestants, frequently assisted by guest mentors. This season, the fashion designer Tommy Hilfiger and Soyon An were employed as image advisers for the Top 10 finalists.

Color key:

Top 13 – Whitney Houston and Stevie Wonder
Guest mentor: Mary J. Blige

On March 7, 2012, the women performed Whitney Houston songs and the men performed Stevie Wonder songs. Seacrest announced that this week will be a competition between the male and female contestants; in a twist, the bottom three of each gender (including the contestant who received the fewest votes for the gender) were announced the next night. The two contestants who got the fewest votes for the gender faced the judges, who decide which contestant is safe from elimination (this does not count as a use of "Judges' Save", a power to save a contestant from elimination until the Top 5).

Top 11 – Year They Were Born
Jermaine Jones was disqualified prior to the Wednesday performance show for failing to disclose his criminal past. Footage of executive producers Nigel Lythgoe and Ken Warwick confronting Jones was shown in what would have been his performance slot, in between Van Pelt's and Laine's performances. A clip of his rehearsal, singing "Somewhere Out There", was shown after his removal from the competition. He was not replaced and the elimination went ahead as normal, unlike the situation seen in season 2 due to the disqualification of Corey Clark. will.i.am served as this week's guest mentor.

Top 10 – Billy Joel
Diddy served as the guest mentor this week. The performance with Steven Tyler's fellow member Joe Perry, "Happy Birthday to You" was performed to celebrate Tyler's birthday.

Top 9 – Their Personal Idols
Duet/trio songs are introduced this week. Stevie Nicks served as the week's mentor.

Top 8 – Songs from the 1980s
Gwen Stefani and Tony Kanal served as co-mentors for this week.

Top 7 (first week) – Songs from the 2010s
Akon served as the guest mentor this week.

Top 7 (second week) – Songs from Now & Then
Each contestant performed two songs: a Billboard number-one hit from the 21st century and a song from the classic soul era. This is the first time in American Idol history that the second week did not feature a double elimination following the use of the "judge's save" last week.

Top 6 – Queen / Contestant's Choice
Contestants performed one Queen song and one song of their preference.

Top 5 – Songs from the 1960s / British Pop
Steven Van Zandt served as the guest mentor this week.

Top 4 – Music of California / Songs They Wish They'd Written

Top 3 – Judges' Choice / Contestant's Choice / Jimmy Iovine's Choice

Top 2 – Simon Fuller's Choice / Favorite Performance / Winner's Single

Elimination chart
Color key:

Results show performances

Controversies

Disqualification of Jermaine Jones
On March 14, finalist Jermaine Jones was disqualified for concealing arrests and outstanding warrants. Jones, however, denied that he had concealed his previous arrests, as he admitted his arrests when he signed up for Idol. A police official in a New Jersey town where he was the target of two arrest warrants said that "the case wasn't big enough to merit going after him in California", and a New Jersey legislator commented that for the show "to expose, embarrass and interrogate a young man without an attorney in front of 40 million viewers was an outrage". Critics suggested that the show may have staged the disqualification to boost ratings. When asked about speculations that producers had prior knowledge of his criminal past and that the producers were simply out to exploit him on-air, Jones replied that "I haven’t even taken my mind into that and why they did what they did, because then I’ll drive myself crazy".

Jennifer Lopez music video
The music video of Jennifer Lopez's song, "Dance Again", which aired on the program, was criticized as inappropriate for younger viewers. Dan Gainor of the Culture and Media Institute wrote, "Even the supposedly family-friendly TV shows like American Idol are never safe in the hands of Hollywood," and went as far as saying her "skanky new video shows how desperate she is to retain her fame despite her fading relevance. Such sexualized videos aren't appropriate for any children to watch, including Lopez's own twins." Jenna Hally Rubenstein from MTV Buzzworthy also commented about the video's content not being appropriate for a family show, "we thought "Idol" was a family show? This video is less "sit on the couch and chill with dad" and more "call your boyfriend over immediately." Ed Masley from AZ central.com said that the video was on the verge of being too "steamy" for the show.

Gender and ethnic biases
Phillip Phillips became the fifth consecutive white male to win the show, which led to some viewers and critics accusing American Idol of having gender and ethnic biases. The bias towards the so-called "white guy with guitar" (WGWG) has been widely commented on before and after the result was known, with some complaining about the predictability of the likely winner. The string of white guitar-playing male winners includes David Cook, Kris Allen, Lee DeWyze, and Scotty McCreery who won seasons 7, 8, 9, and 10 respectively. Just hours before the finale, Richard Rushfield, author of the book American Idol: The Untold Story, said, "You have this alliance between young girls and grandmas and they see it, not necessarily as a contest to create a pop star competing on the contemporary radio, but as…who’s the nicest guy in a popularity contest," he says, "And that has led to this dynasty of four, and possibly now five, consecutive, affable, very nice, good-looking white boys."

U.S. Nielsen ratings
The premiere was watched by 21.93 million viewers. While at the time it drew the second largest audience of any entertainment program in the television season, it was down 16 percent from the previous year's premiere, which was watched by 26.23 million viewers. After seven consecutive years as the most watched program on primetime television (eight years in the 18/49 demo), the eleventh season of American Idol came in second place to NBC Sunday Night Football in total viewers, as well as in the 18/49 demo.

 This episode was shown on Sunday, January 22, 2012, after the NFC Championship Game, but was repeated on Tuesday, January 24, 2012 with ratings of 5.7/9 overall and 3.4/9 for the 18/49 demographic. Overall, the episode averaged 9.64 million viewers.
Episode was bumped out of primetime due to the NFC Championship Game going into overtime, therefore it was not included in the weekly rankings.

See also
 American Idols LIVE! Tour 2012

References

American Idol seasons
2012 American television seasons